The Hangman is a Bollywood drama film produced by Bipin Patel and directed by Vishal Bhandari. The film stars Om Puri, Shreyas Talpade and Gulshan Grover in lead roles. It was set to be released in English first, in 2005 but it failed. Then it was rescheduled to be released in 2007. This time again, the release met with a failure. Finally enough, it was released worldwide on 5 February 2010. A dubbed in English was also released.

Plot
The Hangman, starring internationally acclaimed actor Om Puri (East is East, Jewel in the Crown, City of Joy and Gandhi), is a story about one man's quest to attain redemption. Puri, who gives a compelling performance as the aged and tired executioner Shiva, has been forced into his forefathers' profession.

Shiva's overwhelming desire is to create a better life for his son Ganesh (Shreyas Talpade). Shiva seeks help from his friend, the prison jailor (Gulshan Grover). Ganesh is taken to the city under the jailor's guardianship where he pursues his father's ultimate dream of becoming a police officer. But a series of ill-fated events result in a startling tragedy.

Based in a culture full of ancient customs and traditions, this bittersweet tale follows Shiva as he struggles between the mandates of his profession and his desire to achieve salvation and happiness.

Cast 
Om Puri as Shiva Sathe
Gulshan Grover as Jail Superintendent
Shreyas Talpade as Ganesh Sathe
Smita Jaykar as Parvati Sathe
Tom Alter as Father Mathew
Anita Kanwar as Madam at the brothel
Yatin Karyekar as Billa
Nazneen Ghani as Gauri
Amrita Bedi as Amrita

References

External links
Official site
 
The Hangman at Bollywood Hungama
Film review

2005 films
2000s Hindi-language films

Films about capital punishment